Birdsnest is an unincorporated community in Northampton County, Virginia, United States.  It was also known as Bridgetown Station. The local post office closed in October 2011.

References

Unincorporated communities in Northampton County, Virginia
Unincorporated communities in Virginia